Qaleh Abdollah (also Romanized as Qal‘eh ‘Abdollāh and Qal‘eh-ye ‘Abdollāh; also known as Qal‘eh Abdullah) is a village in Emamzadeh Abdol Aziz Rural District, Jolgeh District, Isfahan County, Isfahan Province, Iran. At the 2006 census, its population was 188, in 47 families.

References 

Populated places in Isfahan County